The Seorak Cultural Festival is a local cultural festival annually held every end of October in Sokcho city, Gangwon Province, South Korea. Sokco is a tourism city surrounded by Mt. Seoraksan National Park and the Sea of Japan (East Sea), so many of the cultural events there are mostly related to the environment and local specialties such as squid.

The festival has been established to promote unity among local residents and Korean traditional folk culture rooted in Sokcho. During the festival period, the local citizens and tourists participate in several events regarding the sea and mountain such as a climbing competition, visiting Seoraksan National Park, a gaetbae (ship)-dragging competition, a fishing competition, trundling of heundeul bawi (흔들바위; literally "swinging rock"), and the tasting of squid dishes.

Gallery

See also
Hi! Seoul Festival
Chuncheon Puppet Festival
Boryeong Mud Festival 
List of festivals in South Korea
List of festivals in Asia

References

External links
Official website

Tourist attractions in Gangwon Province, South Korea
Sokcho
Annual events in South Korea
Folk festivals in South Korea
Cultural festivals in South Korea
Autumn events in South Korea